Andi is a Northeast Caucasian language belonging to the Avar–Andic branch spoken by about 5,800 ethnic Andi (2010) in the Botlikh region of Dagestan. The language is spoken in the villages Andi (along the river Andi-Koisu), Gunkha, Gagatl, Ashali, Rikvani, Chanko, Zilo, and Kvanxidatl.

There are four main dialects, Munin, Rikvani, Kvanxidatl, and Gagatl, which appear quite divergent.  However, the dialects can be said to vary between villages: the "upper-group" contains Andi, Gagatl, Rikvani, and Zilo (where Andi and Zilo are considered their own dialects), whereas the "lower-group" contains Munin and Kvanxidatl. The upper-group lacks the affricate sound кьI.

Although Andi is usually non written, there are attempts to write the language using Russian Cyrillic script. Speakers generally use Avar or Russian as their literary language(s).

Andi has 7 different series of localization: the meaning "inside" changes by number (singular -ла/-а, plural -хъи: гьакъу-ла 'in a home', гьакъоба-хъи 'in houses'). Number categories are expressed through ablaut (имуво воцци в-усон 'The father found the brother', but имуво воццул в-осон 'The father found the brothers'). In the village Andi, there is a difference between the speech of men and women; a man will say, for example, дин meaning 'I', мин meaning 'you', гьекIа 'person', but a woman will say ден 'I', мен 'you', гьекIва 'person'.

Phonology
Andi has 43 consonants:

There are five vowels: .

References

Further reading

 
 Wixman, Ronald. The Peoples of the USSR: An Ethnographic Handbook. (Armonk, New York: M. E. Sharpe, Inc, 1984) p. 11
 Церцвадзе Ил. Андийский яз. Тб., 1965 (на груз. яз.);
 Алексеев М. Е. Андийский язык // Языки мира. Кавказские языки. М., 1999.
 Этимология 1539 андийских слов в БД «StarLing database server» Sergei Starostin
  // The Book of Luke in Andi Language.
  // Glottolog.org Language Map

Articles in class projects/Rutgers
Northeast Caucasian languages
Andic languages
Languages of Russia
Endangered Caucasian languages